Vilmos Zsolnay (April 19, 1828 in Pécs  March 23, 1900 in Pécs) was a Hungarian industrialist and entrepreneur. As the director of the Zsolnay porcelain manufacture he introduced new materials and inventions into the manufacture of pottery and ceramics and led the company to world-wide recognition.

Zsolnay was born on April 19, 1828, in Pécs and studied at Vienna's Polytechnical High School. He returned and joined the company in 1863 to eventually take over its management. He was able to attract talented artists to work for him, and under his directorship the small family-owned company grew into a world-renowned enterprise. The introduction of new techniques and materials was important in this development. With , Zsolnay discovered the eosin process that gives articles an iridescent glaze in multiple colors. Pyrogranite is a ceramic building material that he introduced and that became popular with the architects of the Hungarian art nouveau movement. He displayed his products at several World expositions, and was honored with the French Légion d'honneur and the Order of Franz Joseph in recognition of his artistic work.

As a designer, he was the first major employer for visual artists like Ármin Klein. Important architects of his time were delighted to use Zsolnay's ceramics, e.g.:
 Imre Steindl
 Ödön Lechner
 Aladár Árkay
 Flóris Korb
 Kálmán Giergl
 Béla Lajta
 Samu Pecz
 
 Frigyes Schulek

After he died on March 23, 1900, his son Miklós Zsolnay took over the management of the manufacture.

In 1907 the city of Pécs inaugurated a statue of Vilmos Zsolnay, the first known statue in Hungary in the honour of someone other than statesmen or clergy, highlighting his importance in the contemporary development of commerce and industry. The statue is one of main touristic landmarks of the city.

See also

External links
 Zsolnay homepage
 Informationen about Zsolnay

1828 births
1900 deaths
19th-century Hungarian people
Hungarian potters
People from Pécs